Ciurila is a commune in Cluj County, Transylvania, Romania. It is composed of eight villages: Ciurila, Filea de Jos (Alsófüle), Filea de Sus (Felsőfüle), Pădureni (Magyaróság), Pruniș (Magyarszilvás), Sălicea (Szelicse), Săliște (Tordaszeleste) and Șutu (Sütmeg).

Demographics 
According to the census from 2002 there was a total population of 1,509 people living in this town. Of this population, 97.21% are ethnic Romanians, 2.05% ethnic Romani and 0.59% are ethnic Hungarians.

References 

Communes in Cluj County
Localities in Transylvania